Čaj s kraljico is a novel by Slovenian author Evald Flisar. It was first published in 2004.

Plot 
Vili Vaupotič, a young academic painter, goes to London to reap fame and success with his works of art. On the way across the English Channel, he sees his ideal of love and female beauty, Sandrina, with whom he has not met for a long time. Vili is constantly losing his paintings, but his life's journey from the countryside to a prestigious mansion, where he eventually lands as a family portraitist, ends with the betrothal of the "Queen of Egypt" seeking a rich man and shattering the myth of the perfect Sandrina.

See also
List of Slovenian novels

Slovenian novels
2004 novels